Scrafield is a deserted medieval village or DMV, situated approximately  south-east from the town of Horncastle, Lincolnshire, England.

The village was not listed in Domesday Book of 1086, but first mentioned in documentary sources in 1183.

Scrafield church was dedicated to Saint Michael but fell into disrepair, and by 1842 it had gone, although the churchyard was still used.   The northern part of the churchyard was levelled in 1977, and only a single 18th-century gravestone is visible today.

References

External links

Deserted medieval villages in Lincolnshire
East Lindsey District